Competitive Cyclist Racing Team was a professional road bicycle racing team based in the United States. The title sponsor, CompetitiveCyclist.com, is an online retailer specializing in premium cycling goods. The team merged with Kenda-5 Hour Energy at the end of 2012.

Major wins 
2011
Pro, Age 1–24 San Dimas, Cole House
Overall Redlands Bicycle Classic, Francisco Mancebo
Stage 1, Cole House
Stages 2 & 3, Francisco Mancebo
Overall Tour of the Gila, Francisco Mancebo
Stages 1 & 2, Francisco Mancebo
Overall Cascade Cycling Classic, Francisco Mancebo
Stages 1 & 3, Cesar Grajales
Stage 2, Francisco Mancebo
2012
Stage 1 Rutas de América, Michael Olheiser
Stage 3 Vuelta Mexico Telmex, Thomas Rabou
Tour of the Battenkill, Francisco Mancebo
Stage 1 Tour de Beauce, Francisco Mancebo

2012 team
As of February 8, 2012.

References

External links
 
 

Defunct cycling teams based in the United States
UCI Continental Teams (America)
Cycling teams established in 2010
Cycling teams disestablished in 2012
2010 establishments in the United States
2012 disestablishments in the United States